Rumex pulcher is a species of flowering plant in the knotweed family known by the common name fiddle dock. It is native to Eurasia and North Africa and it can be found elsewhere, including parts of North America, as an introduced species and a roadside weed. Europe. It is quite variable in appearance, and some authorities divide it into several subspecies that are more or less distinguishable. In general, it is a perennial herb producing a slender, erect stem from a thick taproot, approaching 70 centimeters in maximum height. The top of the plant may bend, especially as the fruit develops.  The leaves are up to 10 or 15 centimeters long and variable in shape, though often oblong with a narrow middle in the rough shape of a fiddle. The inflorescence is made up of many branches, each an interrupted series of clusters of flowers with up to 20 in each cluster, each flower hanging from a pedicel. The flower has usually six tepals, the inner three of which are edged with teeth and have tubercles at their centers.

References

External links
 
 
 
 
 Jepson Manual Treatment
 Flora of North America

pulcher
Flora of Europe
Flora of North Africa
Flora of Western Asia
Plants described in 1753
Taxa named by Carl Linnaeus